Alexandru Silviu Costache (born 10 October 1999) is a Romanian professional footballer who plays as a goalkeeper for Minaur Baia Mare.

References

External links
 
 
 

1999 births
Living people
Footballers from Bucharest
Romanian footballers
Association football goalkeepers
Liga I players
Liga II players
CS Concordia Chiajna players
CS Pandurii Târgu Jiu players
FC Unirea Constanța players
FC Dunărea Călărași players
CS Minaur Baia Mare (football) players